Birmingham has 591 parks and open spaces, totalling over , more than any other equivalent sized European city. The centrepieces of Birmingham's park system are the five Premier Parks. Fifteen parks have received the prestigious Green Flag Award. The city also has five local nature reserves, one national nature reserve and a number of Wildlife Trust nature reserves.

One of Birmingham's most popular parks is Cannon Hill Park which covers  consisting of formal, conservation, woodland and sports areas. Recreational activities at the park include boating, fishing, bowls, tennis, putting and picnic areas. The largest of the parks is Sutton Park covering  making it the largest urban nature reserve in Europe. Birmingham Botanical Gardens are a Victorian creation, with a conservatory and bandstand, close to the city centre. The Winterbourne Botanic Garden, maintained by the University of Birmingham, is also located close to the city centre.

History of public parks

Public parks emerged in the 1830s to improve the health of the working classes living in the over-crowded conditions of the rapidly growing industrial town.  It was hoped that parks would reduce disease, crime, and social unrest, as well as providing “green lungs” for the city and areas for recreation.

Most of the land for public parks were either purchased by town councils or donated as gifts. A number of parks were created to commemorate a special occasion, such as the Queen’s Jubilees such as Victoria Park and Queens Park.
Even the area around the NEC has free public park areas where wildlife and Lilly ponds thrive

Premier parks
Cannon Hill Park
Handsworth Park
Kings Heath Park
Lickey Hills
Sutton Park
The City's horticultural training facility at King's Heath Park is paired up with Pershore College.

Nature Reserves
Birmingham EcoPark
Bromwich Wood Local Nature Reserve
Harborne Nature Reserve
Hill Hook Local Nature Reserve
Kings Norton Local Nature Reserve
Moseley Bog Local Nature Reserve
Park Hall Nature Reserve
Plants Brook Local Nature Reserve
Queslett Local Nature Reserve
Rubery Cutting Local Nature Reserve
Sutton Park National Nature Reserve

Public squares

The city centre includes numerous public squares among them are Centenary Square, Chamberlain Square and Victoria Square. The historic Old Square is located on Corporation Street. Rotunda Square and St Martin's Square are two of the newest squares in Birmingham, being located within the Bullring Shopping Centre. Brindleyplace also consists of three squares and the National Sea Life Centre.

Birmingham Parks Strategy
On November 27, 2006, Birmingham City Council Cabinet received a comprehensive set of documents describing a Parks Strategy for the city, ambitious in its intention to meet Government priorities, formally marking the end of a long period of neglect of urban parks. At the beginning of a list of objectives the document says the strategy will ensure that "a network of high quality parks and other green spaces are provided for Birmingham's citizens and visitors".

References

External links
Birmingham Open Spaces Forum